Yoni is the Sanskrit word for the female genitalia.

Yoni may also refer to:

 Yoni (album), a 2007 album by Ginger
Yonin shogi, Japanese chess
Yoni massage
Yoni Expedition

People
 Yoni, a popular Hebrew nickname short for Yonatan, Yonadev, or Yehonatan:
 Yonatan Netanyahu (1946–1976), Israeli army commander  
 Yoni Erlich (born 1977), Israeli tennis player 
 Yoni Wolf (born 1979), American musician
 Yoni (footballer) (born 1979), Spanish footballer

Places
 Yoni, Bombali, a place in Sierra Leone